M3 Competition may refer to:

 Makridakis Competitions
 BMW M3 Competition